Nils Bäckström (born 29 June 1986) is a Swedish ice hockey player who has played professionally in USA, Finland, Sweden and Russia. He currently plays for AIK IF in the Swedish second division, HockeyAllsvenskan.

Playing career
Bäckström began his junior hockey career in his native Sweden with Stocksund and later Djurgårdens IF Hockey. He was drafted by the Detroit Red Wings in the 2004 NHL Entry Draft.

In 2006, he moved to North America, where he attended the University of Alaska Anchorage, playing four seasons of NCAA Division I college hockey with the Alaska Anchorage Seawolves.

During the summer period of 2009 he attended the Washington Capitals development camp. From 2010 to 2012 he played for Ilves in the SM-liiga, Finland. He started the 2012–2013 season with Timrå IK. In January 2013 he signed for AIK IF.

AIK chose not to extend the contract with Bäckström for unknown reasons for the following season, opting him for a new challenge.

He spent the 2013–2014 season in the Russian second division with Rubin Tyumen reaching the final in the playoffs. Stacking up an impressive plus/minus rating during his season earning him with the award for best defenseman in the league. During the 2014–2015 season he rejoined AIK IF.

Career statistics

References

External links

1986 births
AIK IF players
Alaska Anchorage Seawolves men's ice hockey players
Alaska Aces (ECHL) players
Detroit Red Wings draft picks
Djurgårdens IF Hockey players
Ilves players
Living people
Ice hockey people from Stockholm
Swedish ice hockey defencemen
Timrå IK players